The insular dwarf gecko (Lygodactylus insularis) is a species of gecko endemic to Juan de Nova Island (Mozambique).

References

Lygodactylus
Endemic fauna of Mozambique
Reptiles of Mozambique
Reptiles described in 1913
Taxa named by Oskar Boettger